Lisa Hopkins may refer to:
 Lisa Hopkins Seegmiller, American classical singer and actress
 Lisa Hopkins (politician), American politician from West Virginia